Hyde Park and Woodhouse are areas in the metropolitan borough of the City of Leeds, West Yorkshire, England. The areas contain 149 listed buildings that are recorded in the National Heritage List for England. Of these, five are listed at Grade II*, the middle of the three grades, and the others are at Grade II, the lowest grade. The areas are largely residential, and also contain the University of Leeds. Many of the university buildings are listed, some of which are newly built, and others have been converted from pre-existing buildings. Most of the other listed buildings are houses and associated structures, and the rest include churches and memorials in churchyards, a public house, statues and other memorials, buildings in the former Woodhouse Cemetery, schools and associated structures, a cross, and public buildings.


Key

Buildings

References

Citations

Sources

Lists of listed buildings in West Yorkshire